Departmental elections to elect the membership of the Departmental Councils of France's 100 departments were held on 22 and 29 March 2015 (first and second round). In 2015 for the first time, the term "departmental elections" replaced "cantonal elections", and the term "Departmental Council" replaced "General Council".

The Union for a Popular Movement won 27 new departments and lost one, resulting in it holding a majority in 67 Departmental Councils. 62 candidates were elected for the National Front nationwide but the party won no departments.

Electoral system

Like the previous cantonal elections, the departmental elections used a two-round system similar to that employed in the country's legislative elections. One change was that the election adopted paired voting.
2 councillors (a man and a woman) were elected from single-member constituencies (the new cantons adopted in 2014). 
A pair securing the votes of at least 25% of the canton's registered voters and more than 50% of the total number of votes actually cast in the first round of voting would be thereby elected. If no candidate satisfies these conditions, then a second round of voting would be held one week later.
The two pairs who received the highest number of votes in the first round, plus any other candidate or candidates who received the votes of at least 12.5% of those registered to vote in the canton, would be eligible to stand in the second round. 
In the second round, the pair receiving the highest number of votes would be elected.

Neither the city of Paris, the Lyon Metropolis, nor Martinique and French Guiana took part in this election due to their particular statuses.

Opinion polls

Results

References

External links 
Complete first round results

2015
2015 elections in France
March 2015 events in France